Angulyagra is a genus of gastropods belonging to the family Viviparidae.

The species of this genus are found in Southern Asia.

Species:

Angulyagra boettgeri 
Angulyagra burroughiana 
Angulyagra costata 
Angulyagra duchieri 
Angulyagra microchaetophora 
Angulyagra misamisensis 
Angulyagra oxytropis 
Angulyagra pagodula 
Angulyagra partelloi 
Angulyagra philippinensis 
Angulyagra polyzonata 
Angulyagra thersites 
Angulyagra turritella 
Angulyagra voskresenskiana 
Angulyagra wilhelmi

References

Viviparidae